This is a list of works by the Slovenian architect Jože Plečnik (1872–1957), who practised in Vienna, Belgrade, Prague and Ljubljana.

 Langer House, Vienna, 13th district (1900–1901)
 Steggasse Tenement House, Vienna, 5th district (1902)
 Zacherlhaus, Vienna, 1st district (1903–1905)
 St Charles Borromeo Fountain (Karl-Borromäus-Brunnen), Vienna, 3rd district (1906-1909)
 Church of the Holy Spirit, Vienna, 16th district  (1908–1913) 
 Prague Castle (various projects), Prague (1920–1934)
 Prague Castle (Garden of Eden and first court), Prague (1920–1926)
 Church of the Most Sacred Heart of Our Lord, Prague (1928–1932)
 Bežigrad Stadium, Ljubljana (1923–1939)
 Church of St. Francis of Assisi, Šiška, Ljubljana (1925–1927)
 Chamber of commerce, work and industry, Ljubljana (1925–1927)
 Church of St. Michael (Sveti Mihael na Barju), Črna vas near Ljubljana (1937–1939)
 The Bank of Celje building, Celje (1927–1930)
 Church of St. Anthony of Padua Red Cross, Belgrade (1928–1932)
 The Vzajemna zavarovalnica insurance company building, Ljubljana (1928–1939)
 "Tromostovje" or the Triple bridge, Ljubljana (1929–1932) 
 National and University Library, Ljubljana (1930–1941)
 Cobblers' Bridge (Čevljarski or, more accurately, Šuštarski most), Ljubljana (1931–1932)
 Peglezen, the "Flatiron" house, Ljubljana (1932–1934)
 Žale Cemetery, Ljubljana (1937–1940)
 The Fish Market, Ljubljana (1939–1942)
 The Ursuline gymnasium, Ljubljana, (1939–1940)
 Slovene National Parliament, (Katedrala svobode) Ljubljana (1947) (unrealized)
 Križanke, Ljubljana (1952–1956)
 Church of the Visitation in Ponikve (1952–1958)

Notes and references

 
Plecnik